WFIS (1600 AM) was a radio station broadcasting a News Talk Information format to the Fountain Inn/Simpsonville, South Carolina, United States, area. The station was owned by Timeless Media, Inc.

On January 2, 2014, the station's licensee surrendered WFIS' license to the Federal Communications Commission (FCC) for cancellation. The licensee indicated that the surrender was related to their pending application to increase the broadcast power of co-owned station WTZQ in Henderson, North Carolina. On January 3, 2014, the FCC cancelled the station's license.

Translators
WFIS was relayed by an FM translator in Fountain Inn, to improve coverage in areas of the town where reception was poor:

References

External links

FIS
Defunct radio stations in the United States
Radio stations established in 1956
Radio stations disestablished in 2014
1956 establishments in South Carolina
2014 disestablishments in South Carolina
FIS